Borșa (Hungarian: Borsa, German: Borscha,  Borsha) is a town in eastern Maramureș County, Maramureș, Romania, in the valley of the river Vișeu and near the Prislop Pass. Linking Transylvania to Bukovina, Prislop Pass is surrounded by the Rodna and Maramureș Mountains, both ranges of the Carpathians. The highest peak in the region is Pietrosul Rodnei — 2,303 meters.

The Rodna National Park (which has an area of 463 km²) can be accessed from Borșa. The town is home to a wooden church, built in 1718. It administers one village, Băile Borșa.

In 1891, there were 1,432 Jews living in Borșa. The area has lost much of its population following the collapse of the communist regime. In the past, the town of Borșa was also home to a Zipser German community.

Natives 

 Israel Polack (1909–1993), textile industrialist
 Frank Timiș (born 1964), rich businessman based in London

Population

Gallery

References 

Towns in Romania
Populated places in Maramureș County
Localities in Romanian Maramureș
Mining communities in Romania
Monotowns in Romania
Ski areas and resorts in Romania
Shtetls